Kim Robins (born 12 June 1988) is a 3.0 point wheelchair basketball player from Australia. He represented the Rollers team at the 2020 Summer Paralympics.

Biography 
Kim Robins was born on 12 June 1988. He was diagnosed with a neural tube defect when he was about 12 months old. In 1992, as a four year old, he was the poster child for a world-first education campaign run by the Telethon Kids Institute to raise awareness about the link between folate and neural tube defects. He has a degree in sports science from Edith Cowan University and Masters in Finance from RMIT.

Basketball 
He is a 3 point player. At 18, he decided to pursue wheelchair basketball over tennis. A deciding factor was that it was a team sport. “All my friends played, and Western Australia has a long history of producing exceptional wheelchair basketball athletes at an international level.” He has played wheelchair basketball professionally in Perth and Europe.

His international debut for the Rollers was at 2018 Wheelchair Basketball World Championship in Hamburg, Germany, where they won the bronze medal. His Paralympic debut with the Rollers ended with a win against Turkey for fifth place.

At the 2020 Tokyo Paralympics, the Rollers finished fifth with a win/loss record of 4-4.

References

External links

Basketball Australia Profile

1988 births
Living people
Paralympic wheelchair basketball players of Australia
Wheelchair basketball players at the 2020 Summer Paralympics